Less is a 2017 satirical comedy novel by American author Andrew Sean Greer. The plot follows writer Arthur Less as he travels the world on a literary tour to numb his loss of the man he loves. 

The novel won the 2018 Pulitzer Prize for Fiction. The sequel Less Is Lost was published in 2022.

Plot 
Arthur Less is a 49-year-old gay writer of middling success from San Francisco, known primarily for having once been in a relationship with an older gentleman, Robert Brownburn, a Pulitzer Prize-winning poet. He first experienced moderate success with his debut novel, but in the decades since has struggled to garner the same success. His most recent novel, Swift, has recently been rejected by his publisher. Arthur, who is dreading his 50th birthday, is suddenly invited to the wedding of his ex-sweetheart, Freddy Pelu. In attempt to avoid the wedding, Arthur goes on an extensive overseas trip after accepting invitations to the numerous literary engagements which he typically declines.

He first travels to New York City to interview writer H.H.H. Mandern, and then to Mexico City for a conference about Robert. In Turin, Arthur attends an award ceremony where, to his surprise, he wins. He later accepts a teaching offer for a creative writing seminar in Berlin. After a layover in Paris where he meets an old friend, Arthur travels to Morocco to celebrate his 50th birthday in the Sahara. He eventually arrives in India, where he accepts a writer-in-residence at a Christian retreat community in Kerala. Finally, he travels to Japan to write as a food critic. After hearing that Robert has suffered a stroke, Arthur returns home to San Francisco where he finds Freddy there waiting for him.

Background 
The book covers themes such as romantic love, relationships, aging, and travel. Greer began writing Less as a "very serious novel" but found that "the only way to write about [being gay and aging] is to make it a funny story. And I found that by making fun of myself, I could actually get closer to real emotion – closer to what I wanted in my more serious books."

Reception 
Less won the 2018 Pulitzer Prize for Fiction. In reporting the award, the Associated Press accidentally wrote the novel's title as "Fearless." The book also was a New York Times best seller, won the Northern California Book Award, and was a finalist for the Lambda Literary Award for Gay Fiction. In May 2019, Less won the Australian Book Industry Award for International Book of the Year, awarded by the Australian Publishers Association.

References

External links 
Official website

2017 American novels
2017 LGBT-related literary works
2010s LGBT novels
American LGBT novels
Pulitzer Prize for Fiction-winning works
Novels about writers
Novels with gay themes
English-language books
Novels set in San Francisco
Novels set in New York City
Novels set in Mexico City
Novels set in Turin
Novels set in Berlin
Novels set in Paris
Novels set in Morocco
Novels set in Kerala
Novels set in Japan
Travel novels